The Anthem of Love is a 1922 German silent romance film directed by Heinz Schall and starring Claire Rommer, Johannes Riemann and Ilka Grüning.

Cast
 Claire Rommer
 Johannes Riemann
 Ilka Grüning
 Gertrude Welcker

References

Bibliography

External links

1922 films
Films of the Weimar Republic
German silent feature films
German black-and-white films
1922 romantic drama films
German romantic drama films
Films directed by Heinz Schall
Silent romantic drama films
1920s German films